Jane Lucy Hall (born 20 October 1973 in Kingston upon Thames) is a former British rower who won six World Championship medals.

Rowing career
Hall won the gold medal in the lightweight coxless four with Alison Brownless, Annamarie Dryden and Tonia Williams at the 1993 World Rowing Championships.

She was part of the coxless pair with Alison Brownless that won the national title rowing for a Kingston and Thames composite at the 1996 National Championships. She also won a second gold at the same Championships in the eight composite.

References 

 
 Jane Hall profile, on WERROW.co.uk

1973 births
Living people
English female rowers
British female rowers
People from Kingston upon Thames
World Rowing Championships medalists for Great Britain